Kaj Hendriks (born 19 August 1987 in Wageningen) is a Dutch rower. He finished 5th in the coxless four at the 2012 Summer Olympics and became a world champion in the coxless four at the 2013 World Rowing Championships in Chungjiu. At  the 2016 Summer Olympics in Rio de Janeiro he was part of the men's eight team that won a bronze medal.

References
 

1987 births
Living people
Dutch male rowers
Rowers at the 2012 Summer Olympics
Olympic rowers of the Netherlands
People from Wageningen
Sportspeople from Gelderland
World Rowing Championships medalists for the Netherlands
Rowers at the 2016 Summer Olympics
Olympic bronze medalists for the Netherlands
Olympic medalists in rowing
Medalists at the 2016 Summer Olympics
European Rowing Championships medalists
21st-century Dutch people